Å is a village in Andøy Municipality in Nordland county, Norway. The village is located on the east coast of the island of Andøya along the Andfjorden. Its sign is often replaced due to people stealing it for novelty purposes.

See also
List of short place names
Place names considered unusual

Name
The village (originally a farm) was first mentioned in 1567 ("Aa"). The name is from Old Norse á, which means "(small) river".

References

Andøy
Villages in Nordland
Populated places of Arctic Norway